Wettenhall is a surname. Notable people with the surname include:

 Norman Wettenhall (1915–2000), Australian paediatrician, ornithologist and philanthropist
 Steve Wettenhall (born 1963), Australian politician

See also
 Norman Wettenhall Foundation
 Edward Wetenhall